The Sud Aviation SE 210 Caravelle is a French jet airliner produced by Sud Aviation.

It was developed by SNCASE in the early 1950s, and made its maiden flight on May 27, 1955.
It included some de Havilland designs and components developed for the de Havilland Comet.
SNCASE merged into the larger Sud Aviation conglomerate before the aircraft entered revenue service on April 26, 1959, with Scandinavian Airlines System (SAS); 282 were built until production ended in 1972. It was ordered by airlines on every continent and operated until its retirement in 2005.

The short-range, five-abreast airliner is powered by two aft-mounted Rolls-Royce Avon turbojet engines, allowing a clean low wing.
The configuration was later retained in many narrow-body aircraft and regional jets.

Development

Origins
On 12 October 1951, the Comité du matériel civil (civil aircraft committee) published a specification for a medium-range aircraft, which was later sent to the aviation industry by the Direction technique et industrielle. The type and number of engines were not specified. Since 1946, various design studies for aircraft in this category had already been underway at several of the leading French aircraft manufacturing organisations, and had resulted in some ambitious concepts being mooted. None of these firms possessed the financial power to independently embark on the substantial development work involved, let alone to establish a manufacturing line for the construction of such aircraft.

The response to the specification from the French industry was strong, it has been claimed that every major manufacturer submitted at least one proposal; a total of 20 different designs were ultimately received. The majority of these proposals were powered by all-turbojet engine arrangements, although Breguet had entered a number of designs that were powered by both turbojet and turboprop engines; among these was one for a Snecma Atar-powered tri-jet to be developed in association with the SNCA du Nord and a turboprop type; all of the different designs were designated as Br. 978. Hurel-Dubois had entered several turboprop designs based on a narrow fuselage and shoulder-mounted wing, similar to many regional propliners. Proposals from SNCASO included the S.O.60 with two Rolls-Royce Avon RA.7 engines, outfitted with two smaller Turbomeca Marborés as auxiliaries. SNCASE had also returned a number of designs from the X-200 to X-210, all of these being purely jet-powered.

On 28 March 1952, after studying the various entries, the Comité du Matériel Civil announced that it had produced a short list of three entrants: the four-engined Avon/Marbore SNCASO S.0.60, the twin-Avon Hurel-Dubois project, and the three-engined Avon SNCASE X-210. At this point, British engine manufacturer Rolls-Royce had already begun to offer a new version of the Avon that was to be capable of developing 9,000 lbf (40 kN) of thrust, which would render the auxiliary engines of the S.O.60 and the third engine featured on the X-210 unnecessary. The Committee issued a request for SNCASE to re-submit its X-210 proposal as a twin-Avon design. In doing so, SNCASE decided to not remove the remaining engines from their rear-mounted position; most designs had placed the engines underneath the wing, where they could be mounted on the spar for lower overall weight, but it was felt that these weight savings were not worth the effort. This turned out to be a benefit to the design, as the cabin noise was greatly reduced as a result. In July 1952, the revised X-210 design with twin Avons was re-submitted to the Secretariat General for Civil and Commercial Aviation (SGACC).

Selection

Two months later, SNCASE received official notification that its design had been accepted. On 6 July 1953, the SGACC placed a formal order for the construction of a pair of prototypes along with a pair of static airframes for fatigue testing. SNCASE's design licensed several fuselage features from British aircraft company de Havilland, the two companies already having had dealings in respect to several earlier designs. The nose area and cockpit layout were taken directly from the de Havilland Comet jet airliner, while the rest of the airliner was locally designed. A distinctive design feature was the cabin windows in the shape of a curved triangle, which were smaller than conventional windows but gave the same field of view downwards.

On 21 April 1955, the first prototype of the Caravelle (F-WHHH), launched by Madame de Gaulle, was rolled out. On 27 May 1955, the first prototype conducted its maiden flight, powered by a pair of British Rolls-Royce RA-26 Avon Mk.522, capable of providing  of unitary thrust. For the maiden flight, which had a total duration of 41 minutes, the crew consisted of Pierre Nadot (first officer), André Moynot (second officer), Jean Avril (mechanic), André Préneron (radio operator) and Roger Beteille.

Almost one year later, on 6 May 1956, the second prototype made its first flight. The first prototype had been fitted with a cargo door located on the lower left side of the fuselage, but this door was removed in the second prototype in favour of an all-seating arrangement. By October 1956, both prototypes had accumulated in excess of 1,000 flight hours. By the end of 1956, the two aircraft had visited various locations across Europe and North Africa; and trials were already underway for French carrier Air France. During 1957, the second prototype accumulated roughly 2,500 flight hours across various flights conducted throughout North America and South America.

In 1956, the type received its first order from Air France; it was followed by Scandinavian Airlines System (SAS) in 1957. More orders followed, which had been partially driven by a campaign of direct presentations held at airshows and dedicated flight demonstrations using the two prototypes to potential customers. Also during 1956, SNCASE (Sud-Est – Southeast) had merged with SNCASO (Sud-Ouest – Southwest) and several other French aircraft manufacturers to become Sud Aviation; however, the original SE designation assigned to the airliner was retained. In May 1959, the Caravelle received its airworthiness certification, enabling the type to enter passenger service. On 26 April 1959, the Caravelle performed its first flight with paying passengers on board for Scandinavian operator SAS; shortly thereafter, the type commenced operations with Air France as well.

Further development

Within four years of entering airliner service, a total of 172 Caravelles had been sold to a range of operators. Aviation writer M.G. Douglas attributed the type's favourable early sales record to the effective marketing campaign of performing demonstrations to prospective customers using the two prototypes, as well to the Caravelle having effectively no jet-powered rivals, being the only short-haul jetliner for several years following its introduction. Several models of the Caravelle were developed and produced over the lifetime of the production run, often in response to the increasing power of the available engines, which allowed higher takeoff weights to be adopted.

By 1963, there were a total of six different versions of the Caravelle in production, designated III, VI-N, VI-R, 10A, 10B, and X-BIR. Of these, the Caravelle III was considered to be the basic version of the airliner, while the other variants featured an increasing number of improvements. The Caravelle VI-N was equipped with more powerful Avon 531 engines and an additional heat exchanger for the air conditioning, while the Caravelle VI-R, which had come about as a result of demands by U.S. carrier United Airlines, was furnished with thrust reverser-equipped Avon 352s, a revised windscreen design, soundproofing, a new luggage compartment door, and wing spoilers.

The Caravelle 10A and 10B, which differed only in the engines used and were commonly referred to as the Super Caravelle, featured the improvements of the VI-R in addition to a high degree of further design changes. Other changes included the adoption of variable-displacement pumps for the hydraulic system and the use of AC-based generators in place of earlier DC counterparts along with an auxiliary power unit (APU). The redesigned wing was equipped with double-slotted Fowler flaps, additional and repositioned stall vanes, aerodynamic improvements to the wing root and adjustments to the leading edge that improved the performance of the wing during the crucial takeoff and landing phases of flight.
 
Despite its commercial success, however, the Caravelle was soon displaced from being the focus of Sud Aviation's development efforts as the majority of the company's design engineers were progressively reallocated onto an entirely new project that was intended to produce a successor to the Caravelle. The project was relatively ambitious, having the aim of producing a viable supersonic transport that possessed the same general size and range as the Caravelle. It was decided that the envisioned supersonic airliner should be naturally named after the firm's recent success, thus the Super-Caravelle name was applied to the design. Ultimately, the work on the Super-Caravelle would be merged with similar work that had been undertaken by Britain's Bristol Aeroplane Company, and would result in the development of Concorde.

In total, 282 Caravelles of all types were manufactured (2 prototypes or pre-production aircraft and 280 production aircraft); reportedly, Sud Aviation's projected break-even point for the type had been forecast to be around the 200-unit mark.

Design

The Caravelle belongs to the first generation of passenger aircraft to use newly developed jet propulsion technology, and it was the first jet airliner developed specifically for the short/medium-range sector of the market. Early in the Caravelle's career, its chief competitors were propeller-driven aircraft, such as the British-built Vickers Viscount and the U.S.-built Convair CV-440. Reportedly, the Caravelle proved to be a highly reliable airliner during its early years of service. The low accident rate for the type led to lower than average insurance premiums for Caravelle operators.

The Caravelle was typically powered by a pair of British-built Rolls-Royce Avon turbojet engines, installed in a rear-mounted position close to the tail unit. Various models of the Avon engine were adopted for different versions of the airliner, often with increased thrust and additional features such as thrust reversers. Alternative powerplants were adopted or proposed for some Caravelle models, such as the U.S.-built Pratt & Whitney JT8D-1 and General Electric CJ-805-23C engines.

The Caravelle was designed to maximise passenger comfort and operator convenience. The rear entry door had built-in stairs that, while adding structural complexity, meant that mobile airport stairs were unnecessary. On later variants, soundproofing in the form of readily removable mattress-like rolls that fixed in place via existing brackets was added to the design. In some configurations, the Caravelle's cabin was furnished with a number of rearward-facing passenger seats, which was an uncommon arrangement amongst civil aircraft. From September 1963 onwards, an autolanding capability (via two separate systems, of which one was self-contained while the other was integrated with the airliner's autopilot), was made available for the Caravelle by Sud Aviation.
 
The final assembly line for the Caravelle was at Sud Aviation's factory at Blagnac Airport near Toulouse. Much of the aircraft was manufactured at other sites across France and in other countries, however. The production of large portions of the Caravelle had been subcontracted to other manufacturers; these included the Italian aircraft manufacturer Fiat Aviazione, which produced the aircraft's tailplane, fin, ailerons, and engine nacelles; and French aviation firm Breguet Aviation, which performed the outfitting of the rear fuselage; while much of the ancillary equipment of the Caravelle originated from either British or U.S. manufacturers. Sud Aviation constructed and outfitted the nose section, along with manufacturing the tailcone, rudder, Fowler flaps, both the leading edges and trailing edges of the wing, and the majority of the fuselage.

Variants

Caravelle I
 Similar to the original prototypes; first flew on 14 May 1958. French certification was obtained on 2 April 1959, and U.S. certification was obtained six days later. The first revenue flight took place that year with Air France on the Paris-Rome-Athens–Istanbul route. Air France Caravelle registration F-BHRB "Lorraine" was introduced in the Paris-London route on 27 July 1959.
 Sales: 20 were sold; to Air France (10), SAS (6), Air Algérie (2) and VARIG (2). One of the VARIG aircraft was leased by Sud to Air Vietnam and Middle East Airlines before delivery to Royal Air Maroc. In Australia, Trans Australia Airlines had planned to re-equip with the Caravelle but as Ansett felt this was too advanced at that stage for its own needs, under Australia's Two Airlines Policy both airlines were required to purchase the Ansett preference (the less-advanced turbo-prop Lockheed L-188 Electra).

Caravelle IA
 This variant had the same external configuration as variant I but with more powerful engines, the Rolls-Royce Avon RA-29/1 Mk.526 giving improved capabilities. The first flight took place on 11 February 1960. Caravelle I and IA aircraft were later converted to the III variant.
 Sales: 12 built. Deliveries were to Air France, SAS, Air Algérie, Finnair, and Royal Air Maroc.

Caravelle III
 Later improvements to the Avon led to the Caravelle III. It first flew on 30 December 1959, entering service with Alitalia in April 1960.
 Sales: The Series III was the best-selling Caravelle with 78 built. All but one of the 32 Series Is built were upgraded to Series III standard. Air Inter used 16 of this type for its domestic routes. Major deliveries were to Air France, as well as aircraft for Swissair, Alitalia, SAS, and Royal Air Maroc.

Caravelle VI-N
 N standing for "normal". A version with more powerful Avon RA-29/6 Mk 531 and RA 29/6 Mk 531B engines producing  of unitary thrust. The capabilities were improved and the weights increased; the actual payload was reduced. The Caravelle VI-N first flew on 10 September 1960, beginning service with Belgian airline Sabena in January 1961. Five of the 78 Series IIIs were upgraded to Series VI N.
Sales: 53 built. Deliveries to Saeta, Corse Air, Europe A.S., Minerve, Pushpaka Aviation and Yugoslav Airlines.

Caravelle VI-R
 First Caravelle with thrust reversers. The cockpit windows were made larger with redesigned layout and more powerful brakes were introduced. It first flew on 6 February 1961, obtaining U.S. certification on 5 June that same year. It began service with United Airlines on 14 July.
Sales: 56 built, 20 for United Airlines. Other series VI customers included Indian Airlines (9), Panair do Brasil (4), Cruzeiro do Sul, Iberia Líneas Aéreas De España (4), LAN Chile (3), Aerolíneas Argentinas (3) and TAP Portugal (3). This model was also used by Filipinas Orient Airways , Aerocesar, Airborne Express and SA Nacionales.

Caravelle VII  This was a Series III (c/n 042) that was purchased by General Electric, ferried to the United States as Santa Marian 9 and equipped with General Electric CJ805 aft-fan engines, becoming, in effect, the engine test-bed for the Caravelle 10A. Flight tests with the new engines began on 29 December 1960 and a second aircraft was planned to be converted, but this aircraft became the sole Caravelle 10A.

Caravelle 10A
 Based on the Series VII, but intended for the U.S. market, the 10A was  longer than the Series VI, with the windows located  higher on the fuselage. The sole prototype was powered by two  General Electric CJ-805-23C aft-fan engines and flew for the first time on 31 August 1962. A modified wing with improved flaps was fitted to meet U.S. certification requirements, as was an auxiliary power unit (APU) in the rear fuselage. Trans World Airlines (TWA) cancelled its order for 20 aircraft due to financial problems, however, and by the time TWA was in a position to purchase new aircraft, the Douglas DC-9 was preferred. After testing the prototype was scrapped.

Caravelle 10B (Super Caravelle)
 Based on the Series 10A, this variant offered many modifications in respect to other series. It introduced a leading edge extension (a fillet added to the front of an aircraft wings in order to provide usable airflow at high angles of attack). The wing had split flaps instead of the earlier models' double-slotted Fowler flaps and the fuselage was extended , with an increase in passenger capacity to 105. The 10B first flew on August 31, 1964 and was produced as a run of 22 aircraft.
 Launch customer and primary operator of the 10B was Finnair with 8 examples. Aviaco ordered 5 but this was cancelled, with those aircraft going to Sterling Airways, LTU, and Iberia Airlines. Alia and Union des Transports Aériens (UTA) also acquired aircraft.  The last operational Caravelle was a Type 3 10B that flew with Waltair until 2005.

Caravelle 10R
 A combination of the 10B's engines on the Series VI-R fuselage, creating a smaller but higher powered aircraft. It first flew on 8 January 1965 and received U.S. certification on 23 May of that same year.
 A total of 20 were built, starting service with Alia on July 31, 1965. It also flew with Aero Lloyd, CTA, Hispania and SAT, among others.

Caravelle 11R
This enabled it to carry a mixed load of passengers and cargo. First flight of the series 11R was on 21 April 1967.
 Only six were built, delivered to Air Afrique, Air Congo, and Transeuropa of Spain.

Caravelle 12 (Super Caravelle)
 This was the last version of the Caravelle to appear, first flying on 12 March 1971. This allowed for up to 140 passengers over a reduced range. The Caravelle 12 was aimed primarily at the charter market, produced to 12 examples starting in 1972. By this point Concorde was in production; this design was originally known in France as Sud Aviation Super-Caravelle. The Caravelle 12 was often also referred to by this name.
 The launch customer for the Series 12 was Sterling Airways with seven delivered, while the remaining five went to Air Inter. Series 12s flew in Europe until October 1996, and in Africa until more recently.
 The unit cost was US$5.5M. (1972)

Operators

The Caravelle served with airlines on every continent except Australia. In 1957, Trans-Australia Airlines (TAA) sought to order two Caravelles, to service its longest routes, Perth-Sydney and Perth-Melbourne, from 1960. However, the Australian government blocked the order, saying that any further diversity in full-size airliners used on domestic routes would have an adverse impact on aircraft servicing within Australia.

Civil operators

Military and government operators

Incidents and accidents
For 45 years of commercial exploitation, 67 Caravelles have been withdrawn from service as a result of destruction or for irreparable damage. None of these accidents and incidents are attributed to a design defect, only a few technical failures, human errors, or sabotage. The total loss of life in accidents in the Caravelle is more than 1,300. The accident rate per million flights is estimated at more than 5.5, compared with less than 1 for the most recent airliners.

19 January 1960 – Scandinavian Airlines System Flight 871, a Caravelle I, crashed at Esenboga Airport, Turkey due to excessive descent for reasons unknown. Seven crew members and 35 passengers lost their lives.
19 May 1960 — A Caravelle of Air Algérie, F-OBNI, collided with a Stampe single-engine biplane on approach to Paris-Orly and managed to land. The small aircraft was destroyed and its pilot was killed, as well as one passenger of the Caravelle, 18 other persons on board were injured.
12 September 1961 – Air France Flight 2005, a Caravelle III, crashed near Rabat, Morocco after the crew misread instruments, killing all 77 on board.
27 September 1961 – Varig Flight 592-J, a Caravelle III, crashed when landing at Brasília International Airport in Brazil, caught fire and was totally destroyed. Despite this, there were no casualties. Among the passengers were the governor of the Rio Grande do Sul state, Leonel Brizola, and three ministers of state of the newly sworn president João Goulart. This was the first air accident in the new Brazilian capital, founded only 16 months before.
4 September 1963 – Swissair Flight 306 crashed shortly after take-off from Zürich following an in-flight fire, killing all 80 people on board.
18 April 1964 – Middle East Airlines Flight 444 (registration OD-AEM) crashed at night into the Persian Gulf, 10 miles out from Dhahran Airport, Saudi Arabia, killing all 49 on board; the cause was never determined.
15 February 1966 – an Indian Airlines Caravelle VI-N registered as VT-DPP crashed short of the runway at Palam Airport in poor visibility, killing two of 80 on board. 
4 September 1966 – an Indian Airlines Caravelle VI-N registered as VT-DSB struck a hill at 800 feet during a training flight, killing the four crew.
30 June 1967 – Thai Airways International Flight 601, a Caravelle III, crashed into the sea while landing at Hong Kong's Kai Tak Airport during a tropical heavy rainstorm. Twenty-four people were killed.
4 November 1967 – Iberia Airlines Flight 062, a Caravelle 10R, struck Blackdown Hill, Sussex, United Kingdom, killing all 37 passengers and crew.
11 September 1968 – Air France Flight 1611, a Caravelle III en route from the island of Corsica to Nice, France, crashed into the Mediterranean Sea off Nice following an in-flight fire, killing all 95 on board; in 2011 a report surfaced that a missile may have shot down the aircraft.
28 December 1968 – two Middle East Airlines Caravelle VI-Ns (registrations OD-AEE and OD-AEF), along with 12 other aircraft, were destroyed at Beirut International Airport by Israeli commandos in retaliation for a terrorist attack on a Boeing aircraft in Athens.
26 July 1969 – an Air Algérie Caravelle VI-N (registration 7T-VAK) crashed at near Hassi Messaoud Airport, Algeria killing 33 passengers and crew out of 37. The aircraft crashed onto the runway while attempting an emergency landing due to an in-flight fire.
8 October 1969 – A Cruzeiro do Sul Caravelle VI-R en route from Belém-Val de Cães to Manaus-Ponta Pelada in Brazil was hijacked by four people who demanded to be flown to Cuba. The hijacking lasted less than a day and there were no casualties.
1 April 1970 – A Royal Air Maroc Caravelle III registered as CN-CCV crashed on approach to Casablanca following a loss of control, killing 61 of 72 on board.
20 November 1971 – China Airlines Flight 825, a Caravelle III (registration B-1852), crashed near Penghu, Taiwan due to a possible bomb explosion, killing all 25 passengers and crew on board.
7 January 1972 – Iberia Airlines Flight 602 crashed into a mountain while on approach to Ibiza Airport, Spain. All 104 passengers and crew were killed.
14 March 1972 – Sterling Airways Flight 296 crashed 20 mi west of Kalba, United Arab Emirates due to pilot error, killing all 112 passengers and crew in the worst ever accident involving the Caravelle. The accident is also the deadliest in the United Arab Emirates.
1 June 1973 – Cruzeiro do Sul Flight 109, a Caravelle VI-N (registration PP-PDX) operating from Belém-Val de Cans to São Luís crashed on approach to São Luís. The left engine lost power and the aircraft attained an extreme nose-up attitude. It stalled and crashed 760m to the right of the runway. All 23 passengers and crew died.
13 August 1973 – Aviaco Flight 118 crashed near A Coruña, Spain, killing all 85 passengers and crew, while attempting to land at Alvedro Airport (now A Coruña Airport) in heavy fog.
11 September 1973 – JAT Airways Flight 769, a Caravelle VI-N, struck Babin Zub Peak while on approach to Titograd Airport, killing all 41 passengers and crew on board. The accident remains the worst in Montenegro.
22 December 1973 – A Sobelair Caravelle VI-N operating for Royal Air Maroc) Caravelle VI-N (OO-SRD) struck Mount Mellaline while on approach to Tangier Airport, killing all 106 passengers and crew on board.
15 March 1974 – A Sterling Airways Caravelle 10B3 experienced a landing gear failure as it was taxiing for take-off at Tehran's Mehrabad International Airport leading to 15 passengers being killed and 37 passengers and crew injured.
12 October 1976 – Indian Airlines Flight 171, a Caravelle VI-N, crashed at Santacruz Airport following a loss of control caused by an uncontained engine failure and in-flight fire, killing all 95 on board.
18 December 1977 – SA de Transport Aérien Flight 730 crashed into the sea while on final approach to Madeira Airport due to pilot error, killing 36 of 52 on board; the wreckage was found in 2011.
30 September 1978 – A Finnair Caravelle was hijacked by an unemployed home building contractor carrying a gun. With 44 passengers and 5 crew on board the aircraft flew to Amsterdam, Netherlands. After that it flew to Helsinki, where the hijacker released his hostages and received his demanded money. It then flew to Oulu, where he was arrested at his house the following day. 
19 June 1980 - An Airborne Express Caravelle VI-R registered as N905MW crashed at Atlanta Hartsfield Airport on approach to runway 26. The probable cause was listed as poorly a planned approach, vortex turbulence, and failure to follow approved procedures, directives, etc.
21 December 1980 – A Transportes Aereos del César (Aerocésar) Caravelle VIR (registration HK-1810) crashed near Riohacha, Colombia due to an explosion and in-flight fire, killing all 70 on board. The cause of the explosion was unknown.
2 July 1983 - An Altair Caravelle III registered as F-BHRS experienced an uncontained engine failure while accelerating for takeoff at Milan Malpensa Airport, Italy. Takeoff was quickly aborted and all 89 occupants survived but the aircraft was damaged beyond repair. The derelict aircraft remained at Milan Malpensa Airport for years afterward.
18 January 1986 – An Aerovias Caravelle temporarily leased from Ecuador's SAETA crashed in the jungle after missing its first approach, killing all 93 occupants. The flight had originated in Guatemala City and was to land at Mundo Maya International Airport in the northern department of Petén.

Aircraft on display

Europe
 F-BHRA Caravelle III (msn. 1) originally delivered to Air France as Alsace. Preserved at the Piet Smedts Autobedrijf in Baarlo, Netherlands.
 F-BHHI Caravelle III (msn. 2) second prototype – briefly appeared in Air France color scheme but never flew with the airline. Forward fuselage preserved at the Musée de l'Air et de l'Espace in Paris.
 LN-KLH Caravelle III (msn. 3) originally delivered to SAS as Finn Viking. Preserved at the Norwegian Museum of Science and Technology, Oslo, Norway.
 SE-DAA Caravelle III (msn. 4) originally delivered to SAS as Eskil Viking. The nose section is in poor condition at the Finnish Aviation Museum, Helsinki.
 PH-TRO Caravelle III (msn. 33) originally delivered to Transavia Holland. Nose section preserved at the Aviodome, Lelystad, Netherlands.
 OY-KRD Caravelle III (msn. 47) originally delivered to SAS as Ulf Viking. Entire aircraft on display at the Danish Museum of Science & Technology, Helsingør, Denmark.
 F-BHRT Caravelle III (msn. 55) originally delivered to Air France as Picardie. Preserved as instructional airframe at Merville-Colonnes airfield, France
 57 Caravelle III (msn. 57) originally delivered to Royal Air Maroc. On display at Musée Européen de l'Aviation de Chasse, Montélimar, France.
 F-BHRY Caravelle III (msn. 61) originally delivered to Air France as Touraine. On display at the Musée de l'Epopée et de l'Aéronautique in Albert, France.
 OO-SRA Caravelle VI-N (msn. 64) originally delivered to Sabena. Entire aircraft preserved at the Royal Museum of the Armed Forces and Military History, Brussels, Belgium.
 F-ZACE Caravelle III (msn. 116) originally delivered to Finnair as OH-LED and flown by the French Air Force as 116/CE. On display at Musée Européen de l'Aviation de Chasse, Montélimar, France.
 YU-AHB Caravelle VI-N (msn. 135) originally delivered to JAT Yugoslav Airlines as Bled. On display at the Museum of Yugoslav Aviation, near the Nikola Tesla International Airport.
 SE-DAG Caravelle III (msn. 172) originally delivered to SAS as Dag Viking. Currently on display at the Swedish Air Force Museum, Linköping. The aircraft served with the Swedish Air Force (tail number 851) for signal reconnaissance.
 F-BJEN Caravelle 10R Super B (msn. 185) originally delivered to Finnair as OH-LSC Turku. Forward fuselage section preserved Corlier, France, as "Aeroclub du Haut-Bugey".
 SE-DAI Caravelle III (msn. 210) originally delivered to SAS as Alrik Viking. Fully restored in taxiable condition and preserved by Le Caravelle Club at Stockholm Arlanda Airport, Sweden.
 F-BYCY Caravelle 12 (msn. 233) originally delivered to JAT Yugoslav Airlines as YU-AHG and flown by Aerotur and Corse Air. Preserved at Moyenpal, France and was renovated into a hotel
 F-BOHA Caravelle III (msn. 242) originally delivered to Air France as Guyane. On display at Avignon – Provence Airport, France.
 F-GHMU Caravelle 12 (msn. 249) originally delivered to Sterling Airways as OY-STE before being sold to Air Toulouse International; also flew for Air City as HB-IKD and the government of the Central African Republic as TL-ABB and European Air Service as F-GCJT. Preserved and on display at the Ailes Anciennes de Toulouse Museum at Toulouse-Blaganc, France.
 TC-ABA Caravelle 10B (msn. 253) originally delivered to SATA as HB-ICN. Sold to Istanbul Airlines, named Mine. Restored and on display at the Istanbul Aviation Museum, Turkey.
 F-GCVL Caravelle 12 (msn. 273) originally delivered to Sterling Airways as OY-SAE and later flown by Air Inter and Air Provence. Preserved and on display at the Musée de l'Air et de l'Espace, Paris.
 F-GCVK Caravelle 12 (msn. 276) originally delivered to Sterling Airways as OY-SAG and flown by Air Inter. In use as instructional airframe in Air Inter colours at Merville-Colonnes airfield, France
 F-BTOE Caravelle 12 (msn. 280) originally delivered to Air Inter. Preserved and on display at the Aeroscopia Museum at Toulouse-Blagnac Airport, France.

North America
 N1001U  Caravelle VI-R (msn. 86) originally delivered to United Air Lines. Preserved at the Pima Air & Space Museum in Tucson, Arizona in Aero Service markings.
 HK-2836 Caravelle 10R (msn. 211) originally delivered to Finnair as Kuopio. Also flew for Air Charter and EAS - Europe Aero Service as F-GDFZ before being sold to SEC Colombia as HK-3836 and LAS - Lineas Aereas Suramericanas as HK-3836X, going on to serve with the Fuerza Aerea Mexicana, serial 10506. On display inside Parque Aviacuatico Los Manantiales, Jilotepec-Ixtlahuaca Highway at km 39.
 N901MW Caravelle VI-R (msn. 62) originally delivered to Serviços Aéreos Cruzeiro do Sul. Later flew for Airborne Express. Currently preserved on the apron of John Glenn International Airport in Columbus, Ohio.

Africa
 I-DABA Caravelle VI-N (msn. 71) originally with Alitalia, before being sold to the Congo as 9Q-CRU. Repainted and on display at as the "Aero Beach Craft" park and buffet near Entebbe, Uganda.

Specifications

See also

References

Citations

Bibliography

External links

Video in YouTube about TALCE's operations in Africa, showing (among other aircraft) Caravelle 3D-KIK (accessed 2009-05-12)
SudAviation.com – the Caravelle website (accessed 2012-09-11)
"Flying the Caravelle" a 1957 Flight article
 YouTube video of a United Air Lines SE210 Caravelle
 

Caravelle
1950s French airliners
Caravelle
Sud-Est aircraft
[[Category:Twinjets]
Cruciform tail aircraft
Low-wing aircraft
Aircraft first flown in 1955